First Lady of Albania is the unofficial title of the wife or designee of the sitting President of Albania. The curresnt First Lady is Armanda Ymeri, wife of President Bajram Begaj, who has held the role since July 2022.

Role of the first lady
The first lady is not an elected position, carries no official duties, and brings no salary. Nonetheless, she participates in humanitarian and charitable work in conjunction with the office of the presidency. Albanian first ladies have taken an active role in campaigning for the president with whom they are associated. She accompanies the President in state and official protocol visits abroad.

First ladies of Albania (1925–1928 & 1991–present)

Notes

External links
 Kush janë gratë e presidentëve të Shqipërisë dhe kush mbetën të ve. Rrëfimet e grave dhe fotot, NOA, 2012-06-17(in Albanian)
 

Lists of Albanian people
Albania